Northwestern Federal District, is one of the eight federal districts of Russia. It covers most of Northwest Russia. The current Envoy to the Northwestern Federal District is Alexander Gutsan, who was appointed to the post after previously serving as Deputy Prosecutor General. He replaced former Envoy Alexander Beglov, who was removed from the position and made acting Governor of Saint Petersburg.

Demographics

Federal subjects
The district comprises the Northern, Northwestern and Kaliningrad economic regions and eleven federal subjects:

Presidential plenipotentiary envoys
 Viktor Cherkesov (18 May 2000 – 11 March 2003)
 Valentina Matviyenko (11 March 2003 – 15 October 2003)
 Ilya Klebanov (1 November 2003 – 6 September 2011)
 Nikolay Vinnichenko (6 September 2011 – 11 March 2014)
 Vladimir Bulavin (11 March 2014 – 28 July 2016)
 Nikolay Tsukanov (28 July 2016 – 25 December 2017)
 Alexander Beglov (25 December 2017 – 3 October 2018)
 Aleksandr Gutsan  (7 November 2018 – present)

See also
 List of largest cities in Northwestern Federal District (in Russian)
 Novgorod Republic which contained most of the current federal district

Notes

References

External links
 Plenipotentiary of the President of the Russian Federation in the Northwestern Federal District

 
Federal districts of Russia
States and territories established in 2000
2000 establishments in Russia